Yankı Erel and Otto Virtanen were the defending champions, but Erel was no longer eligible to participate in junior events. Virtanen was scheduled to partner Rinky Hijikata, but the pair withdrew before the tournament began.

Jonáš Forejtek and Jiří Lehečka won the title, defeating Liam Draxl and Govind Nanda in the final, 7−5, 6−4.

Seeds

Draw

Finals

Top half

Bottom half

External links 
 Draw

Boys' Doubles
Wimbledon Championship by year – Boys' doubles